Matthew Gregory (December 17, 1680 – May 1777) was a member of the Connecticut House of Representatives from Norwalk, Connecticut Colony in the session of May 1724.

He was the son of Jachin Gregory.

He settled on Belden Hill in Wilton by 1737.

References 

1680 births
1777 deaths
Deacons
Members of the Connecticut House of Representatives
People from Wilton, Connecticut
Politicians from Norwalk, Connecticut